Cristiane may refer to:

Cristiane (footballer) (born 1985), Brazilian footballer
Cristiane Brasil (born 1973), Brazilian lawyer and politician
Cristiane de Morais Smith, Brazilian theoretical physicist
Cristiane Murray (born 1962), Brazilian radio journalist
Cristiane Parmigiano (born 1979), Brazilian judoka
Christiana Ubach (born 1987), Brazilian actress
Christiane Luise Amalie Becker (1778–1797), German actress
Cris Cyborg, also known as Cristiane Justino Venâncio, (born 1985), Brazilian–American mixed martial artist
Debinha, also known as Débora Cristiane de Oliveira, (born 1991), Brazilian footballer
Christiane, a feminine given name